Drymonia ruficornis, the lunar marbled brown, is a moth of the family Notodontidae. It is found in Central and Southern Europe and Anatolia.

The wingspan is 35–40 mm. The fore wings are dark fuscous, almost blackish, with a short white line near the base; the central third is white clouded with the ground colour and limited by white edged black wavy lines. There is a black crescent just above the centre of the wing. Hind wings smoky grey with a pale curved line. Drymonia dodonaea is very similar.

The moth flies from April to June depending on the location.

The larvae feed on oak.

References

Further reading
South R. (1907) The Moths of the British Isles,  (First Series), Frederick Warne & Co. Ltd.,  London & NY: 359 pp. online (as chaonia (Denis & Schiffermüller, 1775))

External links

Lunar marbled brown on UKmoths
Lepidoptera of Belgium 
Lepiforum.de
Vlindernet 

Notodontidae
Moths of Europe
Moths of Asia
Moths described in 1766
Taxa named by Johann Siegfried Hufnagel